Benito Cocchi (5 November 1934 – 5 May 2016) was a Roman Catholic archbishop.

Ordained to the priesthood in 1959, Cocchi served auxiliary bishop of the Roman Catholic Archdiocese of Bologna, Italy from 1974 until 1982. He then served as bishop of the Roman Catholic Diocese of Parma from 1982 to 1996. Cocchi then served as archbishop of the Roman Catholic Archdiocese of Modena-Nonantola from 1992 until 2010.

Notes

1934 births
2016 deaths
Italian Roman Catholic archbishops